Acacia calcarata is a shrub belonging to the genus Acacia and the subgenus Phyllodineae.

Description
It blooms from July to August and produces yellow flowers. It has ribless light grey glabrous branchlets that are a reddish colour at extremities. The pungent and rigid phyllodes are ascending to erection the branchlets, The phyllodes are commonly shallowly curved and pentagonal-quadrangular in cross section. Each rudimentary inflorescence normally has two flower heads. Each flower head is globular and contains 16 to 22 golden flowers.

Taxonomy
The species was first formally described by the botanists Joseph Maiden and William Blakely in 1928 in the work Descriptions of fifty new species and six varieties of western and northern Australian Acacias, and notes on four other species published in the Journal of the Royal Society of Western Australia. Leslie Pedley reclassified it in 2003 as Racosperma calcaratum but it was transferred back to the current name in 2006.

It is quite similar with Acacia inamabilis and has phyllodes and branchlets resemble Acacia asepala.

Distribution
The shrub is native to an area in the Goldfields-Esperance regions of Western Australia but it has a scattered distribution. It is found between Norseman in the south and as far north as Leonora where it grows in red sandy loamy rocky soils A calcarata is often part of open mallee scrub or tall shrubland communities.

See also
 List of Acacia species

References

calcarata
Acacias of Western Australia
Plants described in 1928
Taxa named by Joseph Maiden
Taxa named by William Blakely